is a 1984 Japanese comedy film directed by Yoji Yamada. It stars Kiyoshi Atsumi as Torajirō Kuruma (Tora-san), and Reiko Ōhara as his love interest or "Madonna". Tora-san's Forbidden Love is the thirty-fourth entry in the popular, long-running Otoko wa Tsurai yo series.

Plot
In the midst of Japan's rising economy of the mid-1980s, the itinerant Tora-san becomes drunk with a hard-working company section chief. After an hour commute, the two sleep off their night's revelry at the section chief's home in Ibaraki Prefecture. When the section chief disappears due to the pressure of his job, Tora-san helps his wife to find the man, while secretly hoping they do not, as he has fallen in love with her.

Cast
 Kiyoshi Atsumi as Torajirō
 Chieko Baisho as Sakura
 Reiko Ōhara as Fujiko Tominaga
 Masakane Yonekura as Kenkichi Tominaga
 Jun Miho as Akemi
 Shimojo Masami as Kuruma Tatsuzō
 Chieko Misaki as Tsune Kuruma (Torajiro's aunt)
 Gin Maeda as Hiroshi Suwa
 Hidetaka Yoshioka as Mitsuo Suwa
 Hisao Dazai as Boss (Umetarō Katsura)
 Gajirō Satō as Genkō

Critical appraisal
Director Yoji Yamada was nominated for the Golden Prize at the 14th Moscow International Film Festival. At the Japan Academy Prize long-time Otoko wa Tsurai yo composer, Naozumi Yamamoto was nominated for Best Music Score for his work in this film. Stuart Galbraith IV rates the film no better than average for the series, but still recommends it highly due to the series' high standards. He notes that it benefits from an opening dream-sequence satire of kaiju eiga, or monster films, with footage from Shochiku's entry in this genre, The X from Outer Space, employed. This was meant to reference Godzilla's return from retirement in The Return of Godzilla (1984), which had been released just before the Tora-san film. Kevin Thomas of the Los Angeles Times wrote that the film was a "little slow in getting to its wrap-up, but it's the kind of honestly sentimental film that leaves you feeling better when the lights go up than when they went down."  The German-language site molodezhnaja gives Tora-san's Forbidden Love three and a half out of five stars.

Availability
Tora-san's Forbidden Love was released theatrically on December 28, 1984. In Japan, the film was released on videotape in 1987 and 1996, and in DVD format in 2002 and 2008.

References

Bibliography

English

German

Japanese

External links
 Tora-san's Forbidden Love at www.tora-san.jp (official site)

1984 films
1984 comedy films
Films directed by Yoji Yamada
1990s Japanese-language films
Otoko wa Tsurai yo films
Shochiku films
Japanese sequel films
1980s Japanese films
1990s Japanese films